Ara James Najarian (born September 11, 1960) is a Council member and four-time Mayor of Glendale, California. Najarian lost his 2016 primary race running for Board of County Supervisors during which he had the endorsement of the League of Conservation Voters.

Legal career
He served as a law clerk in the Narcotics Section and Glendale Branch Office of the Los Angeles District Attorney's Office from 1983 to 1984. From 1988 to 1998, he was a partner with the law firm of Najarian and Virgilo in Glendale, California. Since 1998, he has operated his own law firm located in Glendale. Since 1992, he has served as a Judge Pro Term for the Los Angeles Superior Court and the Glendale Superior Court. He also is an Arbitrator and Settlement officer for both courts.

Public service

Pre-political career
From 1996 to 2002, he served as a Commissioner on the Glendale Transportation and Parking Commission. He served as Chairman of the commission from 2000 to 2001 and from 2002 to 2003. From 1998 to 2005, he served on Glendale's Short Range Transit Plan, Circulation Element, and San Fernando Road Corridor Zoning committees.

Political career
He has served on the Glendale City Council since April 2005. He served as Mayor of Glendale from 2007 to 2008, 2010 to 2011, 2015 to 2016, and 2019 to 2020.

Community service
He is a Member of the Board of Directors of the Los Angeles County Metropolitan Transportation Authority. He served as Chairman of the Los Angeles County Metropolitan Transportation Agency from 2009 to 2010. He has been a Member of the Board of Directors of the Southern California Regional Railroad Authority (Metrolink) since 2006. He served as Chairman of the Glendale Housing Authority from 2012 to 2013, Chairman of the Glendale Redevelopment Agency from 2009 to 2010, and Chairman of the Glendale Transportation and Parking Commission. He is a member, Vice Chairman and former Chairman of the San Fernando Valley Council of Governments. He is a member and former Chairman (2010-2011) of the Metropolitan Transportation Authority Board of Directors.

He served on the Glendale Community College Board of Trustees from 2003 to 2005.

Since 1984, he has served as the Director of Medical Outreach for Armenians, Inc.

Since 2003, he has served on the Holy Family High School Board of Regents.

Education
He graduated from Occidental College with a bachelor's degree in Economics in 1982 and from the University of Southern California with a Juris Doctor degree in 1985.

Personal life
He is married to Palmira Perez. Ara has two children (Alexander and Christopher).

References

External links
City of Glendale, CA : Glendale Mayors
Metrolink Board of Directors

1960 births
People from Cleveland
Occidental College alumni
USC Gould School of Law alumni
California city council members
Mayors of Glendale, California
American people of Armenian descent
Living people
Ethnic Armenian politicians